Norman Nato (born 8 July 1992) is a French professional racing driver who is currently driving in Formula E for Nissan. Nato is known for finishing as the runner-up in the 2010 F4 Eurocup 1.6 season and the 2012 Formula Renault 2.0 Alps season, and for winning both in Monaco and Hungary in the 2014 Formula Renault 3.5 Series season.

Career

Early career

Karting
Born in Cannes, Nato began his karting career at the age of nine and won the Championnat de France "Minimes" and "Cadet" categories in 2004 and 2005 before winning the Copa Campeones Trophy KF2 in 2007. In 2009, Nato won the French KZ2 Championship which he followed with a win at the KZ2 Monaco Kart Cup in 2010.

Formula Renault
Nato made his debut in single-seater competition in 2010 by joining the F4 F4 Eurocup 1.6 series with the Autosport Academy team. The Frenchman won on debut at the Ciudad del Motor de Aragón and took one further victory at the Circuit de Barcelona-Catalunya. Nato ended the season with eight podium finishes and 123 points to finish as runner-up to Stoffel Vandoorne.

In 2011, Nato graduated to Eurocup Formula Renault 2.0 with the R-ace GP team. He finished 11th overall after taking two podiums at the Nürburgring and the closing race of the season in Barcelona, with another five points-scoring finishes. He also partially competed in Formula Renault 2.0 Northern European Cup with the same team, bringing another podium at Nürburgring.

For 2012, Nato continued to race in the Eurocup but joined debutants RC Formula. He took one victory at Spa alongside three podium finishes at Aragon, the Nürburgring and the Hungaroring to finish fourth overall with 96 points.

Nato also raced in Formula Renault 2.0 Alps in 2012 and battled against Daniil Kvyat for the title. In the final race of the season in Barcelona, he was involved in an accident with Kvyat and finished as the runner-up with a three-point deficit. He ended the season with four wins and four further podium finishes.

Nato graduated to the highest tier of the World Series by Renault in 2013 by joining DAMS in the Formula Renault 3.5 Series as a team-mate to Kevin Magnussen. He took one pole position and finished 13th in the Drivers' Championship with 33 points.

The Frenchman stayed on with the team for the 2014 season, this time partnering Carlos Sainz Jr. Nato took two victories which included a Grand Slam performance at the prestigious Monaco race in which he won from pole position and set the fastest lap. He finished seventh in the standings with 89 points.

GP2 Series
On 29 January 2015, it was confirmed that Arden International had signed Nato as its number one driver in the GP2 Series. He finished 18th overall with 20 points.

Nato joined Racing Engineering for the 2016 GP2 Series and won the opening race of the season in Barcelona. He finished on the podium again in Monaco, Hungary and Malaysia, and took one further victory at Monza to finish fifth in the Drivers' Championship with 136 points.

In 2017, Nato returned to Arden to start his third season in the Formula One feeder series, now renamed as Formula 2. He took one win after beating eventual champion Charles Leclerc at the Baku City Circuit and recorded two further podiums, finishing as the runner-up in the Bahrain and Silverstone Feature Races. Nato finished ninth overall, accumulating 91 points.

European Le Mans Series
For the 2018 season, Nato made a switch to sportscar racing by joining the European Le Mans Series with Racing Engineering in the LMP2 class. He won the opening race of the season at Le Castellet alongside team-mates Paul Petit and Olivier Pla. Nato took one further podium at the Red Bull Ring to finish third in the championship standings with 66 points.

Alongside his ELMS campaign, Nato contested his first 24 Hours of Le Mans in which he finished in 10th place with SMP Racing. He also raced at the 2018 Petit Le Mans in the WeatherTech SportsCar Championship, finishing in 11th place with Tequila Patron ESM.

For 2019, the Frenchman joined reigning ELMS champions G-Drive Racing and contested the opening two races of the season, taking fourth place at Le Castellet and winning at Monza.

World Endurance Championship
Nato made his debut in the FIA World Endurance Championship in 2019 in which he raced at the 6 Hours of Spa with LMP2 team TDS Racing, taking fourth in class.

For the 2019–20 season, Nato joined LMP1 team Rebellion Racing. The Frenchman took his first FIA World Endurance Championship victory at the 4 Hours of Shanghai and also won the 2020 Lone Star Le Mans at the Circuit of the Americas.

Nato took second place at the 88th running of the 24 Hours of Le Mans. He ended the campaign in third place in the Drivers' Championship alongside team-mates Gustavo Menezes and Bruno Senna, finishing on the podium on six occasions in seven entries.

For 2021, Nato joined Realteam Racing to compete in LMP2, partnering Loic Duval and team owner Esteban Garcia.

Formula E

ROKiT Venturi Racing (2018–2021)

Reserve driver (2018–2020)
In 2018, Nato was named as Venturi Racing's reserve driver in Formula E. The Frenchman took part in the series' official Rookie Test in Marrakesh and set the 10th-fastest time. He continued in the role into the 2019–20 season, and again took part in Formula E's official rookie test, taking sixth position.

2020–21 season
In 2020, Nato was promoted to a full-time race seat with Venturi as a team-mate to Edoardo Mortara, replacing 11-time Formula One race winner Felipe Massa.

After making his debut at the 2021 Diriyah ePrix, Nato finished on the podium in only his fourth race start by taking third in Race 2 in Rome, however, was disqualified after overconsuming energy.

Two weekends later, the Frenchman again finished inside the top three by taking second place in Race 2 of the Valencia ePrix, but after receiving a five-second time penalty, was demoted to fifth.

After missing out on silverware twice, Nato finally finished on the podium by concluding his season with a dominant victory in Berlin, taking Venturi's third win in Formula E. With this result, and outside of Formula E's inaugural campaign, Nato became only the third driver to win a race in their rookie season. The Frenchman finished in 18th position in the Drivers' Championship with 54 points, becoming Venturi's most successful rookie driver in history.

Nato was replaced by Lucas di Grassi on 15 September 2021 for Season 8.

Jaguar TCS Racing (2022)

2021–22 season
After failing to secure a full-time drive, Nato joined Jaguar Racing as the team's reserve driver, partnering former Venturi driver Tom Dillmann. Nato stepped up to a race seat for the final weekend of the campaign in Seoul, deputising for Sam Bird who sustained a fracture in his left hand during the previous race weekend in London.

Nissan Formula E Team (2023–)

2022–23 season
Nato returned to a full-time Formula E seat for the 2022–23 season, partnering Sacha Fenestraz at Nissan. During the season opener at Mexico City, the Frenchman was forced to retire from the race after Robin Frijns crashed into the rear of the Frenchman's car on the first lap.

Racing record

Career summary

Complete F4 Eurocup 1.6 results 
(key) (Races in bold indicate pole position) (Races in italics indicate fastest lap)

Complete Eurocup Formula Renault 2.0 results
(key) (Races in bold indicate pole position) (Races in italics indicate fastest lap)

Complete Formula Renault 2.0 Alps Series results 
(key) (Races in bold indicate pole position; races in italics indicate fastest lap)

Complete Formula Renault 3.5 Series results
(key) (Races in bold indicate pole position) (Races in italics indicate fastest lap)

Complete GP2 Series results
(key) (Races in bold indicate pole position) (Races in italics indicate fastest lap)

† Driver did not finish the race, but was classified as he completed over 90% of the race distance.

Complete FIA Formula 2 Championship results
(key) (Races in bold indicate pole position) (Races in italics indicate points for the fastest lap of top ten finishers)

Complete European Le Mans Series results

‡ Half points awarded as less than 75% of race distance was completed.

Complete 24 Hours of Le Mans results

Complete FIA World Endurance Championship results

Complete IMSA SportsCar Championship results
(key) (Races in bold indicate pole position) (Races in italics indicate fastest lap)

Complete Formula E results 
(key) (Races in bold indicate pole position; races in italics indicate fastest lap)

References

External links
 
 
 

1992 births
Living people
Sportspeople from Cannes
French racing drivers
French F4 Championship drivers
Formula Renault 2.0 NEC drivers
Formula Renault Eurocup drivers
Formula Renault 2.0 Alps drivers
World Series Formula V8 3.5 drivers
GP2 Series drivers
FIA Formula 2 Championship drivers
24 Hours of Le Mans drivers
European Le Mans Series drivers
FIA World Endurance Championship drivers
Formula E drivers
Auto Sport Academy drivers
R-ace GP drivers
RC Formula drivers
DAMS drivers
Arden International drivers
Racing Engineering drivers
G-Drive Racing drivers
W Racing Team drivers
Rebellion Racing drivers
Venturi Grand Prix drivers
TDS Racing drivers
WeatherTech SportsCar Championship drivers
Blancpain Endurance Series drivers
SMP Racing drivers
Extreme Speed Motorsports drivers
Karting World Championship drivers
Jaguar Racing drivers
Nismo drivers
Audi Sport drivers
Le Mans Cup drivers